The men's 30 kilometre classical cross-country skiing competition at the 1988 Winter Olympics in Calgary, Canada, was held on Monday 15 February at the Canmore Nordic Centre in Canmore.

Each skier started at half a minute intervals, skiing the entire 30 kilometre course. The Swede Thomas Wassberg was the 1987 World champion and Nikolay Zimyatov of the Soviet Union was the defending Olympic champion from 1984 Olympics in Sarajevo, Yugoslavia.

Results
Sources:

References

External links
 Final results (International Ski Federation)

Men's cross-country skiing at the 1988 Winter Olympics
Men's 30 kilometre cross-country skiing at the Winter Olympics